Cornelis Kalkman (5 May 1928 in Delft – 19 January 1998, Leiden) was a Dutch botanist.

References

 

1928 births
1998 deaths
20th-century Dutch botanists
Leiden University alumni
Academic staff of Leiden University
People from Delft
Knights of the Order of the Netherlands Lion